Lamaholot, also known as Solor or Solorese, is a Central Malayo-Polynesian dialect cluster of Flores, Indonesia. The varieties may not be all mutually intelligible; Keraf (1978) reports that there are 18 languages under the name.

The Lamaholot language shows evidence of a Papuan (non-Austronesian) substratum, with about 50 percent of the lexicon being non-Austronesian.

Various Lamaholot dialects are presented as independent languages by Ethnologue. For example, Lewotobi is presented as a separate language by Ethnologue and Grimes (1997).  disputes this, classifying it instead as a dialect of Lamaholot.

An additional dialect of Lamaholot not found in Ethnologue, Muhang, is spoken by the Ata Tana 'Ai people living in Sikka Regency. The first children's book in Muhang, Walde Nenang Uran Wair, was published in 2022.

Lamaholot is similar to Sika to the west and Kedang to the east. Lamaholot dialects are often divided into three groupings: western (Flores), central (east Flores, Adonara, and Solor) and eastern (Lembata). Alorese (parts of the coast of northern Pantar and western Alor) is partially intelligible with Lamaholot and is often considered to be a dialect of it.

Phonology

Consonants 

Phonemes in parentheses are used in loanwords.

Vowels

References

Bibliography
 
 
 
 

Flores-Lembata languages
Languages of Indonesia